Kožuf Mountain or Tzena / Zona is a mountain situated in the southern part of North Macedonia and northern part of Greece. Associated village names are Konopište, Kavadarci and Gevgelija.  is a mineral springwater site on its northeastern flank. Kavadarci Municipality and Gevgelija Municipality split the mountain.

Its most western parts reach the river Blashnica, and the north-western side stretches in a line, from the Mrezhichko village via the village of Konopište, through the course of Boshava to the city of Demir Kapija. Kožuf is a specific mountain because it is the first natural barrier in North Macedonia that is directly exposed to the influences of the Mediterranean and the Aegean Sea. Its highest peak is Zelen Breg (or Portes), at 2,171 meters above the sea level. 

A new and modern ski center, whose construction began in 2001, was opened in 2009 on the mountain.

Gallery

References

External links 

 Ski Kozuf
 Restoran Icic
 Tzena - Pinovo - East Voras terrain map by Geopsis

Ski areas and resorts in North Macedonia
Greece–North Macedonia border
Two-thousanders of Greece
Two-thousanders of North Macedonia